The Kremlin Press Secretary or officially Press Secretary of the President of the Russian Federation (Russian: Пресс-Секретарь Президента Российской Федерации) is a senior official in the Presidential Administration of Russia whose primary responsibility is to act as spokesperson for the Russian  Federation government administration, especially with regard to the President, senior executives, and policies. Sometimes described as 
Press Attache of the President of the Russian Federation.

The Press Secretary is responsible for collecting information about actions and events within the president's administration and issues the administration's reactions to developments around the world. The Press Secretary interacts with the media, and deals with the Kremlin pool.

Responsibilities
The Press Secretary is responsible for collecting information about actions and events within the president's administration and around the world, and interacting with the media. The information includes items such as a summary of the President's schedule, whom the president has seen, or had communication and the official position of the administration on the news.

List of Press Secretaries

See also
People's Commissariat for Posts and Telegraphs of the RSFSR
Ministry of Communications (Soviet Union)
Ministry of Foreign Affairs (Russia)
Kremlin Chief of Staff

External links
Kremlin Official Accreditations at the official Moscow Kremlin website

References

Government of Russia